Félix Heredia Pérez (born June 18, 1975) is a former Major League Baseball relief pitcher. On October 18, 2005, he became the 11th MLB player to be suspended for testing positive for steroids.  He is also known as "El Gato Flaco" (Skinny Cat in Spanish) and, "The Run Fairy" (a nickname sarcastically lampooning his poor performances in the latter part of his career).

Heredia attended Escuela Dominical in Barahona. That year, he was 5–3 with one save and a 2.69 ERA in 69 relief appearances. However, he made just three appearances with the Mets in 2005 before going on the disabled list with an aneurysm in his left shoulder in June, and he missed the rest of the season.

The following off-season, he signed with Arizona, but was released during spring training. Four days later, Heredia signed with the Cleveland Indians, appearing in eight games for their Triple-A affiliate, the Buffalo Bisons, before being released on May 12. On December 16, 2006, the Detroit Tigers signed him to a minor league deal, but despite a 2.00 ERA in spring training, Heredia was released.

Heredia is married with three children and resides in Santo Domingo, Dominican Republic.

See also
List of sportspeople sanctioned for doping offences

References

External links

1975 births
Living people
Águilas Cibaeñas players
Brevard County Manatees players
Buffalo Bisons (minor league) players
Chicago Cubs players
Cincinnati Reds players
Columbus Clippers players
Dominican Republic expatriate baseball players in Canada
Dominican Republic expatriate baseball players in the United States
Dominican Republic sportspeople in doping cases
Florida Marlins players
Gulf Coast Marlins players
Kane County Cougars players

Major League Baseball pitchers
Major League Baseball players from the Dominican Republic
Major League Baseball players suspended for drug offenses 
New York Mets players
New York Yankees players
Portland Sea Dogs players
Tampa Yankees players
Toronto Blue Jays players
Trenton Thunder players
Azucareros del Este players
Dominican Republic expatriate baseball players in Mexico
Dorados de Chihuahua players
Leones del Escogido players
Rojos del Águila de Veracruz players
St. Lucie Mets players
Sultanes de Monterrey players
Tigres del Licey players